Nevis Community Radio Ltd (Nevis Radio) is a community radio station broadcasting from Fort William in Scotland, serving the communities of Fort William and the surrounding region of Lochaber including Fort Augustus, Mallaig, Glen Coe, Kinlochleven and parts of the Isle of Skye.

Nevis Radio is a registered charity with OSCR No. SC044464.

Nevis Radio broadcasts 24 hours a day from its base in the Ben Nevis Industrial Estate, Fort William, with original local programming for part of the day, and automated repeats and music service at other times. The station started out in 1992 as Ski FM from the Nevis Range ski resort, keeping skiers up to date with conditions on Aonach Mor. This was then followed by Holiday FM during the summer. Those behind the station's trial broadcasts soon realized that Lochaber needed a permanent voice on the radio, and Nevis Community Radio Action Group formed to raise funds to establish a full-time local radio station (this group has now ceased).

Nevis Radio was awarded a local commercial radio license for Fort William and Lochaber in 1994, and started full-time year-round operation. In 2012, the station successfully applied to Ofcom for relicensing as a Community Radio station.

The station broadcasts on 96.6 MHz (Fort William), 97.0 MHz (Glencoe), 102.3 MHz (Skye & Mallaig) and 102.4 MHz (Loch Leven) FM, the station also transmits live on the net too. In 2008, it also started to provide a 'sustaining service' for Lochbroom FM in the Ullapool area outwith that station's locally produced hours, but this arrangement was suspended after a few months (a replacement service for Lochbroom FM has been provided by Two Lochs Radio since 2012).

Events 
Nevis Radio broadcasts from various events in and around its transmission area. Annually, the station broadcasts from The Scottish Six Days Trial, during which the breakfast show airs live from the event. Nevis Radio also broadcasts coverage of the UCI Mountain Bike World Championships.

Other events include covering various Highland Games, Agricultural Shows, Hustings, Freshers Week at UHI College, Fort William Town Christmas Gathering.

Plus Live musical gigs throughout the area.

News, sport, traffic and travel 
Nevis Radio broadcasts a national news service from Sky News on the hour, plus local news provided during daytime hours, using unattributed news stories taken directly from local papers the Lochaber Times, & The Press & Journal.

Regular Traffic and travel updates feature during the day.

Presenters 
Weekday daytime presenter Simon Abberley is the only person remunerated. All the other presenters are unpaid volunteers.

References

External links 
 
 Nevis Radio Information

Radio stations in Scotland
Radio stations in the Highlands & Islands
Fort William, Highland